Tunde Adeleke (born July 12, 1995) is a professional Canadian football defensive back for the Hamilton Tiger-Cats of the Canadian Football League (CFL).

University career
Adeleke played U Sports football for the Carleton Ravens from 2013 to 2016.

Professional career

Calgary Stampeders
Adeleke was drafted by the Calgary Stampeders in the third round, 25th overall, in the 2017 CFL Draft and signed with the team on May 27, 2017. He played for two seasons with the Stampeders and won his first Grey Cup championship after the team's victory in the 106th Grey Cup game.

Hamilton Tiger-Cats
Adeleke signed as a free agent with the Hamilton Tiger-Cats on February 12, 2019.

References

External links
Hamilton Tiger-Cats bio

1995 births
Canadian football defensive backs
Calgary Stampeders players
Hamilton Tiger-Cats players
Living people
Nigerian players of Canadian football
Carleton Ravens football players
Sportspeople from Lagos